Lake George is a mill pond on Deep River in Hobart, Indiana, in the United States.

Lake George was formed when George Earle constructed a dam on Deep River to power sawmills and gristmills. The lake is fed by several small streams, including Deep River, the largest, and Turkey Creek.

The lake is a popular site for recreation in Hobart. Two local parks and multiple residential areas border the lake and Deep River.

Since its creation, the lake has accumulated a large amount of sediment in its upstream wetland areas that washes into the lake during rainfall events, leading to a decrease in water quality. In 1995, the U.S. Geological Survey carried out a survey of the lake to measure the thickness of sediment. As a result of this survey, the lake was dredged in 2000, removing nearly 600,000 cubic yards of sediment.

References 

Bodies of water of Lake County, Indiana